Yarden Shua (born 16 June 1999) is an Israeli professional footballer who plays as a winger or as an attacking midfielder for Israeli Premier League club Beitar Jerusalem.

Early life
Shua was born and raised in the Tel Aviv District, Israel, to a family of Jewish descent.

See also
List of Jewish footballers
List of Jews in sports
List of Israelis

References

External links

 Yarden Shua at PlaymakerStats.com
 
 

1999 births
Living people
Israeli footballers
Jewish footballers
Israeli Jews
Israel youth international footballers
Association football forwards
Association football midfielders
Association football wingers
Bnei Yehuda Tel Aviv F.C. players
Maccabi Haifa F.C. players
Beitar Jerusalem F.C. players
Israeli Premier League players
Footballers from Tel Aviv